Diploderma iadinum, also known as the emerald mountain dragon, is a species of lizard. It is endemic to Yunnan, China.

References 

Diploderma
Reptiles of China
Endemic fauna of Yunnan
Reptiles described in 2016
Taxa named by Cameron D. Siler
Taxa named by Che Jing